The Guatemalan Handshake is a 2006 comedy-drama film, written and directed by Todd Rohal. It is Rohal's feature film debut. The film premiered at the 2006 Slamdance Film Festival and won the Special Jury Prize.

Story
In the confusion following a massive power outage, an awkward demolition derby driver vanishes, setting in motion a series of events affecting his pregnant girlfriend, his helplessly car-less father, a pack of wild boy scouts, a lactose intolerant roller rink employee, an elderly woman in search of her lost dog, and his best friend—a ten-year-old girl named Turkeylegs.

Pieces of the mystery begin to come together as Turkeylegs sets out to find her missing friend. Cars drive circles in the dirt, a woman attends her own funeral, the sun rises sideways and an orange vehicle trades hands again and again. Everything eventually culminates in a massive demolition derby that throws all of the characters into different directions.

Main cast
Katy Haywood – Turkeylegs
Ken Byrnes – Mr. Turnupseed
Will Oldham – Donald Turnupseed
Sheila Scullin – Sadie
Rich Schreiber – Stool
Kathleen Kennedy – Ethel Firecracker
Cory McAbee – Spank Williams

Accolades
In 2006, Rohal was named one of Filmmaker'''s 25 New Faces of Independent Film on the strength of The Guatemalan Handshake, his debut feature, which had won Best Film at Slamdance earlier that year.

The film won three prizes at the 2006 Torino Film Festival, including Best Director for Rohal. It shared the festival's Jury Special Prize with Honor of the Knights and the 2006 Holden award with Honor of the Knights and Zapiski putevogo obkhodchika.

2006 in film

References

External linksBenten Films'' official DVD webpage

2006 films
2006 comedy-drama films
American independent films
American comedy-drama films
2006 independent films
2000s English-language films
2000s American films